Johann Pollatschek was an Austrian footballer. He played in two matches for the Austria national football team from 1906 to 1907.

References

External links
 

Year of birth missing
Year of death missing
Austrian footballers
Austria international footballers
Place of birth missing
Association footballers not categorized by position